Park Eun-seok (born 10 February 1984) is a South Korean actor. He is best known for his work in theatre and is also known for his breakout performance in the 2020 television drama The Penthouse: War in Life.

Life
Born in South Korea, Park immigrated to the US with his family at the age of 7, settling in Long Island, Huntington, New York. He returned to Korea in 2005 at the age of 21 to pursue an acting career. Being a permanent resident of the United States at the time, Park voluntarily served in the South Korean military in order to improve his Korean. He later gave up his permanent resident status after being discharged from the military.

Filmography

Television series

Film

Television shows

Web shows

Stage

Awards and nominations
 2015 SACA Awards Popular Actor Award
 2016 The 12th Golden Ticket Awards Theatrical Actor Award	
 2018 MBC Drama Awards	Men's Nominated Best Actor Award in the Wolhwa Mini Series
 2019 KBS Drama Awards	Nominated Male Rookie Award	
 2019 KBS Drama Awards	Nominated One-act Men's Series	
 2020 SBS Drama Awards Male Supporting Actor 
 2021 SBS Drama Awards Excellence Award for an Actor in a Mini-Series Genre/Fantasy Drama	 (The Penthouse: War in Life 2 and 3) / nom

Listicles

References

External links
 
 
 

1984 births
Living people
21st-century South Korean male actors
South Korean male television actors
South Korean male film actors
South Korean male stage actors
South Korean male musical theatre actors
South Korean male web series actors
Seoul Institute of the Arts alumni